Jianhua Lu is a professor at the Department of Electronics Engineering, Tsinghua University, Beijing, China. His expertise is related to telecommunications. He is an academician of the Chinese Academy of Sciences, elected in 2015. He was named Fellow of the Institute of Electrical and Electronics Engineers (IEEE) in 2015 for contributions to the theory and engineering applications of wireless transmission technologies. He was recognized in China for making important contributions to satellite communications.

References 

https://web.archive.org/web/20170601145346/http://www.tsinghua.edu.cn/publish/newthuen/newthuen_cnt/faculties/faculties-2-45.html

Fellow Members of the IEEE
Living people
Year of birth missing (living people)